The 1936 Idaho Southern Branch Bengals football team was an American football team that represented the University of Idaho, Southern Branch (later renamed Idaho State University) as an independent during the 1936 college football season. In their second season under head coach Guy Wicks, the team compiled a 4–4 record and outscored opponents by a total of 138 to 111.

Future Idaho State head football coach Babe Caccia played on the team. Various members of the team returned to campus for a 25th year reunion in October 1961.

Schedule

Notes

References

External links
 1937 Wickiup football section — yearbook summary of the 1936 season

Idaho Southern Branch
Idaho State Bengals football seasons
Idaho Southern Branch Bengals football